Park Jong-hun or Pak Jong-hun (박종훈) may refer to:
Pak Jong-hun (박정훈; born 1948), North Korean footballer
Park Jong-hoon (born 1965), South Korean gymnast
Park Jong-hun (baseball), South Korean baseball player

See also
Park Jeong-hun (disambiguation) (박정훈)